Mark Douglas Tinordi  (born May 9, 1966) is a Canadian former professional ice hockey defenceman who played in the National Hockey League (NHL) for 12 seasons between 1987–88 and 1998–99. Tinordi became the coach of the Washington Junior Nationals in the 2006–07 season; he is also the director of the Washington Junior Nationals College Development Program.

His son, Jarred Tinordi, is also a professional ice hockey player.

Playing career
Mark Tinordi was signed as an undrafted free agent by the New York Rangers on January 4, 1987. He was traded in early 1988 to the Minnesota North Stars in a multi-player deal. Three seasons later in 1991, his hard-nosed style helped guide the North Stars to their improbable playoff run to the 1991 Stanley Cup Finals, where they eventually lost to the Pittsburgh Penguins. The captain of the team, Tinordi remained in that role when the team became the Dallas Stars prior to the 1993–94 NHL season. After playing in Dallas for one season, he was traded to the Washington Capitals in the deal that sent Kevin Hatcher to the Stars. Tinordi played the final five seasons of his career with the Capitals, which included an appearance in the 1998 Stanley Cup Finals. He was selected by the Atlanta Thrashers in the 1999 NHL Expansion Draft, but retired prior to the 1999–2000 NHL season without playing for them.

He played 663 career NHL games, scoring 52 goals and 148 assists for 200 points and 1,514 penalty minutes. His best statistical season was the 1992–93 NHL season, when he set career highs with 15 goals and 42 points.

Personal life
Tinordi and his first wife Lorene have four children, Matthew, Jarred, Natalie, and Jacob. Tinordi resides in Millersville, Maryland with his second wife, Jessica. Jarred is also a professional ice hockey player and was drafted 22nd overall by the Montreal Canadiens in the 2010 NHL Entry Draft.

Career statistics

Regular season and playoffs

International

Awards
 WHL East First All-Star Team – 1987

References

External links

1966 births
Canadian people of Italian descent
Calgary Wranglers (WHL) players
Canadian ice hockey defencemen
Colorado Rangers players
Dallas Stars players
Sportspeople from Red Deer, Alberta
Kalamazoo Wings (1974–2000) players
Lethbridge Broncos players
Living people
Minnesota North Stars players
National Hockey League All-Stars
New Haven Nighthawks players
New York Rangers players
Undrafted National Hockey League players
Washington Capitals players
Ice hockey people from Alberta